The 2009 International Formula Master was the third and last International Formula Master season. The season consisted of eight double-header events, beginning on May 16 at Pau and ending on September 20 at Imola. Fabio Leimer claimed the title for Jenzer Motorsport, winning his seventh race of the season at Motorsport Arena Oschersleben.

Prize Tests

Like the previous season, the top drivers in the International Formula Master series standings at the end of the year will be awarded with a wide range of prize tests in various other racing categories.

As champion, Fabio Leimer received a GP2 Series test with French team DAMS, with Leimer, Sergey Afanasyev and Josef Král all earning the chance to use the chassis simulator of Formula One team Red Bull Racing for a day.

In addition, tests have also been confirmed with Indy Lights team Sam Schmidt Motorsports and with the Chevrolet Cruze used in the World Touring Car Championship.

Teams and drivers
R = Series rookie for 2009

Race calendar

Championship Standings
 Points for both championships were awarded as follows:

In addition:
 One point was awarded for Pole position for Race One
 One point was awarded for fastest lap in each race

Drivers

Teams

References

International Formula Master seasons
International Formula Master
International Formula Master